Mul (literally "mule") (died 687) was an Anglo-Saxon ruler of the Kingdom of Kent in England.

Biography

The name Mul is very unusual and it has been postulated that it derives from the Latin mulus meaning mule, a word which is known to have entered the Old English vocabulary; presumably it was a nickname which became habitual. Mul's father was Coenberht, making him a member of the House of Wessex (a descendant of Cynric) and his brother was Caedwalla of Wessex. Mul is described as briefly ruling as King of the Kingdom of Kent following its conquest by Caedwalla in 686.  The Anglo-Saxon Chronicle relates that in 686, "Caedwalla and Mul, his brother, ravaged Kent and Wight." Mul's reign is also mentioned in a charter of Swæfheard.

Death
Mul seems to have only ruled a year before the local population rose up in revolt against him in 687, chasing him and his followers into a building near the local church and setting it on fire, burning them to death. The Anglo-Saxon Chronicle reports that "Mul was burned in Kent, and 12 other men with him; and that year Caedwalla again ravaged Kent." The same Chronicle notes that in 694 the people of Kent came to terms with Ine of Wessex, Caedwalla's successor, and granted him a sum "because they had burned Mul earlier".

See also
House of Wessex family tree
List of monarchs of Kent
Chronology of Kentish Kings

References

External links
 

687 deaths
Anglo-Saxon warriors
Kentish monarchs
7th-century English monarchs
Year of birth unknown
House of Wessex